The cabezon (Scorpaenichthys marmoratus) is a large species of sculpin native to the Pacific coast of North America.  Although the genus name translates literally as "scorpion fish", true scorpionfish (such as lionfish) belong to the related family Scorpaenidae.  The cabezon is the only known member of its genus.

Taxonomy
The cabezon was first formally described as Hemitripterus marmoratus in 1854 by the American physician and ichthyologist William Orville Ayres with its type locality given as California. Both Ayres and the French biologist Charles Frédéric Girard published the specific name marmoratus for this taxon in 1854, Ayres published his name on 8 September in The Pacific, a San Francisco based journal in which the California Academy of Sciences published its meeting reports and the name was published once more on 22 September in the Proceedings of the California Academy of Sciences. Girard's name was deemed to have been published on 6 October and authorship was confirmed in favour of Ayres in the ICZN Opinion 1583 in 1990. Girard classified this species in the monospecific genus Scorpaenichthys. the cabezon is classified as belonging to the monotypic family Scorpaenichthyidae in the 5th edition of Fishes of the World. but subsequent authorities have placed the taxon within the Jordaniidae. In either case the cabezon is regarded as one of the more basal members of the superfamily Cottoidea.

Description

The cabezon is a scaleless fish with a broad bony support extending from the eye across the cheek just under the skin. It has 11 spines on the dorsal fin. The cabezon also has a stout spine before the eye, an anal fin of soft rays, and a fleshy flap on the middle of the snout. A pair of longer flaps are just behind the eyes. The mouth is broad with many small teeth. The coloring varies, but is generally mottled with browns, greens and reds. >90% of red fish are males, whereas >90% of green fish are females. The flesh is blue in color as are the internal organs. As the Spanish-origin name implies, the fish has a very large head relative to its body.

Distribution and habitat

Cabezon are found in the northeast Pacific Ocean from Alaska to Baja California.

Fishing technique

Cabezon feed on crustaceans, mollusks, fish and fish eggs. Cabezon are taken as a game fish, but their roe is toxic to humans, because of the occurrence of a toxic phospholipid (Dinogunellin). Cabezon inhabit the tops of rocky ledges as opposed to rockfish and lingcod, which usually inhabit the sheer faces of these features.

References

http://www.nmfs.noaa.gov/speciesid/fish_page/fish66a.html
International Game Fish Association "World Saltwater Records"
Occurrence of a toxic phospholipid in cabezon roe

Cottoidea
Western North American coastal fauna

Fish described in 1854